Irène de Trebert (1921–1996) was a French singer, dancer and actress. A singer of Swing music, she enjoyed great popularity during the years of the German occupation of France despite Nazi disapproval of her style of music. In 1942 she starred in the film Mademoiselle Swing, performing many of her songs.

Selected filmography
 Mademoiselle Swing (1942)
 Duel in Dakar (1951)
 Monsieur Octave (1951)

References

Bibliography
 Larry Portis. French Frenzies: A Social History of Pop Music in France. 2004.

External links

1921 births
1996 deaths
French film actresses
People born at sea
20th-century French women singers